The 1942 Ince by-election was held on 20 October 1942.  The by-election was held due to the appointment as north-west regional fuel controller of the incumbent Labour MP, Gordon Macdonald.  It was won by the unopposed Labour candidate Tom Brown.

References

1942 elections in the United Kingdom
1942 in England
1940s in Lancashire
Elections in the Metropolitan Borough of Wigan
By-elections to the Parliament of the United Kingdom in Greater Manchester constituencies
By-elections to the Parliament of the United Kingdom in Lancashire constituencies
Unopposed by-elections to the Parliament of the United Kingdom (need citation)